The Best Of Banaroo is the first greatest hits album released by the German group Banaroo. It was also the final CD released with the original members Bobby, Steffy, Vito and Cat before Banaroo disbanded in 2008.

The CD features their hits and popular songs from their first four albums as well as two new songs, both cover songs, "Crying At The Discotheque" originally by Alcazar and "Waterloo" originally by ABBA.

Track listing
 "Dubi Dam Dam" 1
 "Space Cowboy" 1
 "Sing and Move (La La La Laaaa)" 3
 "Make You See The Stars" 1
 "Uh Mamma" 3
 "Ba Yonga Wamba" 4
 "Sailor Dance" 3
 "Crying At The Discotheque"
 "Superhero" 4
 "Summer In The Sun" 4
 "I'll Fly Away" 4
 "Waterloo"
 "I Never Wanna Live My Life Without You" 1
 "Don't Leave" 4
 "How Deep Is Your Love" 1
 "Mamacita" 3
 "Coming Home For Christmas" 2
 "Sweet Inspiration" 2
 "Only Love" 2
 "The Miracle Of You" 2

1 taken from the album Banaroo's World
2 taken from the album Christmas World
3 taken from the album Amazing
4 taken from the album Fly Away

2007 greatest hits albums
Banaroo albums